Ettore Pozzoli (July 23, 1873 – November 9, 1957) was an Italian classical pianist and composer.

Biography 

Born in the Italian city of Seregno, Ettore Pozzoli began his career soon after he received his music diploma from the Milan Conservatory in 1895. While writing music for piano and orchestra, he started teaching at the Milan Conservatory. 

His works on theory and solfeggio, even nowadays considered the basis of the studies of any pianist, are known for the progressive difficulty, for harmony and counterpoint. 

His composition, Danza fantastica, was chosen in 1956 as the compulsory piece for competitors at the sixth World Accordion Contest in Gdańsk. 

Pozzoli died on 9 November 1957 in Seregno (Italy), where, since 1959, an international piano contest in his honour takes place organized by the City.

Repertoire and technique 
 16 Studi di agilità per le piccole mani
 I primi esercizi di stile polifonico
 La tecnica giornaliera del pianista, Casa Ricordi, Milano, 1927
 Studi di Media Difficoltà per Pianoforte
 Studi a moto rapido per Pianoforte
 Sorrisi infantili
Metodo d'armonia, Casa Ricordi, Milano, 1946–1975, ISMN M-041-82225-9
Solfeggi parlati e cantati, Casa Ricordi, Milano
Sunto di Teoria musicale - I, II, III Corso, Casa Ricordi, Milano.

International Ettore Pozzoli Piano Competition 
The International Ettore Pozzoli Piano Competition, for tradition and amount of prize, is one of the oldest and most prestigious piano competitions in the world, taking place in Seregno, Italy, since 1959 and held every 2 years.

External links 
International Ettore Pozzoli Piano Contest web site

1873 births
1957 deaths
People from Seregno
Italian classical pianists
Male classical pianists
Italian male pianists